Rhinotragus conformis is a species of beetle in the family Cerambycidae. It was described by Monné and Fragoso in 1990.

References

Rhinotragini
Beetles described in 1990